Lam Khlong Ngu National Park (thai: อุทยานแห่งชาติลำคลองงู) is a national park in Chale, Thong Pha Phum District, Kanchanaburi Province, Thailand. It was established on 25 December 2009. The park, caves and waterfall are in the protected area of Department of National Parks, Wildlife and Plant Conservation.{
  "type": "Feature",
  "geometry": {
    "type": "Point",
    "coordinates": [14.893405, 98.786196]
  }}

Geography 
Lam Khlong Ngu occupies 420,374 rai ~  and is located on Tanaosri Mountains from north to south. Most of the area is covered with many valleys and hills. The height of middle sea level is about 100 – 1000 meters. The important hill is Bor Ngam hill.

Climate 
The climate is tropical monsoon. It is influenced by Southwest monsoon in summer and Northeast monsoon in winter. In summer, the weather is the hottest and in winter, the weather is the coolest. It has three seasons : Summer from March until May, Rainy from June until October and winter from November until February. From June to September there are many clouds while from November to April a few clouds are found.

Attractions

Nang Kruan Waterfall 

Nang Kruan waterfall is a big limestone waterfall in Lam Khlong Ngu. Water runs in the waterfall all the year-round. The headwater is from Thong Pha Phum creek and Chalae creek. There are 7 levels.

Kliti waterfall 

Kliti waterfall is a limestone waterfall like Nang Kruan waterfall.

Monolithic cave 

Waterway of Lam Khlong Ngu flows through the cave and inside monolithic cave has the monolithic is located by nature. The cave has the highest monolithic in the world. The height is 62.5 meters.

See also
List of national parks of Thailand
List of Protected Areas Regional Offices of Thailand

References 

National parks of Thailand
Geography of Kanchanaburi province